The ninth season of the long-running food reality television series Man v. Food premiered on December 28, 2021, at 9PM ET on the Cooking Channel, and is also the show's second season to air on the network. It is the fifth season of the show to be hosted by actor and food enthusiast Casey Webb, who took over hosting duties upon the show's revival in 2017; Webb became the show's longest-serving host with this season, surpassing original host Adam Richman, who had hosted for four seasons.

Filming for season 9 began in the fall of 2021. Like all previous seasons, Webb travels to various local eateries in different cities before taking on a pre-existing food challenge in each city.

The final season tally was 7 wins for Man and 3 wins for Food.

Episodes

References

Man v. Food
2021 American television seasons